CWP may refer to:

 Cable & Wireless plc (stock symbol on the New York Stock Exchange)
 Cakewalk Project, a Cakewalk Sonar sequencing software project file
 Camp White Pine
 Causeway Point
 Centralized Warning Panel (see Annunciator panel)
 Chinese Wikipedia
 Chronic Widespread Pain (see Fibromyalgia#Genetics)
 Coalition of Women for a Just Peace
 Coalworker's pneumoconiosis
 Commonwealth Writers' Prize
 Communist Workers' Party (United States)
 Computing with words and perceptions
 Concealed Weapons Permit, see Concealed carry in the United States
 Coordinating Working Party on Fishery Statistics
 Cotswold Water Park
 Cotswold Wildlife Park, a zoo in Oxfordshire, England
 Crown Wheel and Pinion, see Differential (mechanical device)
 Current Warming Period, see Global warming